The 2019 Kunming Open was a professional tennis tournament played on outdoor clay courts. It was the eighth (ATP) and second (WTA) edition of the tournament and part of the 2019 ATP Challenger Tour and the 2019 WTA 125K series respectively. It took place in Anning, China, from 15–28 April 2019.

Men's singles main draw entrants

Seeds 

 1 Rankings as of 8 April 2019.

Other entrants 
The following players received wildcards into the singles main draw:
  Gao Xin
  He Yecong
  Li Yuanfeng
  Liu Hanyi
  Sun Fajing

The following player received entry into the singles main draw as an alternate:
  Nicolás Barrientos

The following players received entry from the qualifying draw:
  Jacob Grills
  Ben Patael

Women's singles main draw entrants

Seeds 

 1 Rankings as of 15 April 2019.

Other entrants 
The following players received wildcards into the singles main draw:
  Duan Yingying
  Ma Shuyue
  Peng Shuai
  Yang Zhaoxuan
  Zhang Shuai
  Zheng Saisai

The following player received entry using a protected ranking:
  Gao Xinyu

The following players received entry from the qualifying draw:
  Miharu Imanishi
  Kaylah McPhee
  Chihiro Muramatsu
  Peangtarn Plipuech

The following player received entry as a lucky loser:
  Miyabi Inoue

Withdrawals 
  Deniz Khazaniuk → replaced by  Miyabi Inoue

Retirements 
  Irina Khromacheva (fever)
  Danielle Lao (right lower leg injury)
  Sabina Sharipova (gastro-intestinal illness)
  Zhang Kailin (low back injury)

Women's doubles main draw entrants

Seeds 

 Rankings are as of 15 April 2019

Other entrants 
The following pair received entry as alternates:
  Maddison Inglis /  Miyabi Inoue

Withdrawals 
  Irina Khromacheva (viral illness)

Retirements 
  Ashley Kratzer (left shoulder injury)

Champions

Men's singles

 Jay Clarke def.  Prajnesh Gunneswaran 6–4, 6–3

Women's singles

 Zheng Saisai def.  Zhang Shuai 6–4, 6–1

Men's doubles

 Max Purcell /  Luke Saville def.  David Pel /  Hans Podlipnik Castillo 4–6, 7–5, [10–5]

Women's doubles

 Peng Shuai /  Yang Zhaoxuan def.  Duan Yingying /  Han Xinyun 7–5, 6–2

References

2019 in Chinese tennis
2019
2019 WTA 125K series
Kunming Open
April 2019 sports events in China